The Pragmateia, is one of the seven major books of the prophet Mani, written and regarded as part of the major canon of Manichaeism.

The text is now lost and its exact contents are currently unknown. According to historical records and fragments found in Turfan, the text was likely focused on human history. The text is also mentioned in accounts of the Monijiao branch of Manichaeism (including its religious and political movement known as the White Lotus Society) from the Song dynasty.

References 

Manichaean texts
Texts in Syriac
3rd-century books
Lost religious texts